Carl Garrigus (September 2, 1931 – November 17, 1975) was an American football quarterback who played one season with the Hamilton Tiger-Cats of the Canadian Football League. He played college football and baseball at the University of Miami. He died on November 17, 1975 due to injuries suffered in a car crash.

References

External links
Just Sports Stats

1931 births
1975 deaths
Players of American football from Miami
American football quarterbacks
Canadian football quarterbacks
American players of Canadian football
Miami Hurricanes baseball players
Miami Hurricanes football players
Hamilton Tiger-Cats players
Road incident deaths in Florida
Players of Canadian football from Miami